The 1978 Pacific Coast Athletic Association men's basketball tournament (now known as the Big West Conference men's basketball tournament) was held March 2–4 at the Anaheim Convention Center in Anaheim, California.

Cal State Fullerton topped defending champions  in the championship game, 64–53, to win its first PCAA/Big West men's basketball tournament. 

The Titans, in turn, received a bid to the 1978 NCAA tournament, where they advanced to the Elite Eight. It was CSUF's first Division I tournament appearance.

Format
The tournament field expanded again, this time increasing from six to seven teams (Fresno State participated in its first PCAA tournament). 

Seven of the eight total PCAA members (newcomer UC Irvine was not invited) qualified for the event and were seeded based on regular season conference records. The top team earned a bye into the semifinal round while the remaining six teams entered into the preliminary first round.

Bracket

References

Big West Conference men's basketball tournament
1977–78 Pacific Coast Athletic Association men's basketball season
Pacific Coast Athletic Association men's basketball tournament
Pacific Coast Athletic Association men's basketball tournament